The 2023 WNBA season will be the 25th season for the Connecticut Sun franchise of the Women's National Basketball Association. It also was the 21st season for the franchise in Connecticut after relocating from Orlando. 

On November 22, 2022, the Sun announced that Stephanie White would be the new head coach for the franchise, after Curt Miller left for the same job with Los Angeles. White previously coached in the WNBA with the Indiana Fever, while most recently coaching for the Vanderbilt Commodores women's basketball team.

Transactions

WNBA draft

Transactions

Roster Changes

Additions

Subtractions

Roster

Schedule

Regular season

|- 
| 1
| May 19
| @ Indiana
| 
| 
| 
| 
| Gainbridge Fieldhouse
| 
|- 
| 2
| May 21
| Washington
| 
| 
| 
| 
| Mohegan Sun Arena
| 
|- 
| 3
| May 23
| @ Washington
| 
| 
| 
| 
| Entertainment and Sports Arena
| 
|- 
| 4
| May 27
| @ New York
| 
| 
| 
| 
| Barclays Center
| 
|- 
| 5
| May 30
| Indiana
| 
| 
| 
| 
| Mohegan Sun Arena
| 

|- 
| 6
| June 1
| @ Minnesota
| 
| 
| 
| 
| Target Center
| 
|- 
| 7
| June 4
| Dallas
| 
| 
| 
| 
| Mohegan Sun Arena
| 
|- 
| 8
| June 6
| Las Vegas
| 
| 
| 
| 
| Mohegan Sun Arena
| 
|- 
| 9
| June 8
| Las Vegas
| 
| 
| 
| 
| Mohegan Sun Arena
| 
|- 
| 10
| June 11
| @ Atlanta
| 
| 
| 
| 
| Gateway Center Arena
| 
|- 
| 11
| June 15
| Atlanta
| 
| 
| 
| 
| Mohegan Sun Arena
| 
|- 
| 12
| June 18
| @ Los Angeles
| 
| 
| 
| 
| Crypto.com Arena
| 
|- 
| 13
| June 20
| @ Seattle
| 
| 
| 
| 
| Climate Pledge Arena
|
|- 
| 14
| June 22
| @ Minnesota
| 
| 
| 
| 
| Target Center
| 
|- 
| 15
| June 25
| Chicago
| 
| 
| 
| 
| Mohegan Sun Arena
| 
|- 
| 16
| June 27
| New York
| 
| 
| 
| 
| Mohegan Sun Arena
| 

|- 
| 17
| July 1
| @ Las Vegas
| 
| 
| 
| 
| Michelob Ultra Arena
|
|- 
| 18
| July 6
| Seattle
| 
| 
| 
| 
| Mohegan Sun Arena
| 
|- 
| 19
| July 9
| Washington
| 
| 
| 
| 
| Mohegan Sun Arena
|
|- 
| 20
| July 12
| @ Chicago
| 
| 
| 
| 
| Wintrust Arena
|
|- 
| 21
| July 18
| @ Phoenix
| 
| 
| 
| 
| Footprint Center
|
|- 
| 22
| July 20
| Atlanta
| 
| 
| 
| 
| Mohegan Sun Arena
|
|- 
| 23
| July 22
| @ Atlanta
| 
| 
| 
| 
| Gateway Center Arena
|
|- 
| 24
| July 25
| @ Dallas
| 
| 
| 
| 
| College Park Center
|
|- 
| 25
| July 30
| Minnesota
| 
| 
| 
| 
| Mohegan Sun Arena
|

|- 
| 26
| August 1
| Minnesota
| 
| 
| 
| 
| Mohegan Sun Arena
|
|- 
| 27
| August 4
| @ Indiana
| 
| 
| 
| 
| Gainbridge Fieldhouse
|
|- 
| 28
| August 8
| @ Seattle
| 
| 
| 
| 
| Climate Pledge Arena
|
|- 
| 29
| August 10
| @ Phoenix
| 
| 
| 
| 
| Footprint Center
|
|- 
| 30
| August 12
| @ Dallas
| 
| 
| 
| 
| College Park Center
|
|- 
| 31
| August 18
| Dallas
| 
| 
| 
| 
| Mohegan Sun Arena
|
|- 
| 32
| August 20
| @ Chicago
| 
| 
| 
| 
| Wintrust Arena
|
|- 
| 33
| August 22
| @ Washington
| 
| 
| 
| 
| Entertainment and Sports Arena
|
|- 
| 34
| August 24
| New York
| 
| 
| 
| 
| Mohegan Sun Arena
|
|- 
| 35
| August 27
| Los Angeles
| 
| 
| 
| 
| Mohegan Sun Arena
|
|- 
| 36
| August 31
| Phoenix
| 
| 
| 
| 
| Mohegan Sun Arena
|

|- 
| 37
| September 1
| @ New York
| 
| 
| 
| 
| Barclays Center
|
|- 
| 38
| September 5
| Los Angeles
| 
| 
| 
| 
| Mohegan Sun Arena
|
|- 
| 39
| September 8
| Indiana
| 
| 
| 
| 
| Mohegan Sun Arena
|
|- 
| 40
| September 10
| Chicago
| 
| 
| 
| 
| Mohegan Sun Arena
|
|-

Standings

Statistics

Regular season

Awards and Honors

References

External links

Connecticut Sun at ESPN.com

Connecticut Sun seasons
Events in Uncasville, Connecticut
Connecticut
Connecticut Sun